Abdoulaye Diop (born 1965) is a Malian diplomat who served as Minister of Foreign Affairs of Mali from 2014 to 2017. Previously he was Mali's Ambassador to the United States, appointed to that position in 2003.

Biography
Diop received a Master of Arts in International Relations from the International Institute of Public Administration in Paris, France, a Master of Arts in Diplomacy and Management of International Organizations from the Paris-Sud 11 University, and a Bachelor of Arts in Diplomacy from the National School of Administration of Algeria.

Diop was an adviser to Malian presidents Alpha Oumar Konaré and Amadou Toumani Touré. In 2000 and 2001, Diop oversaw Mali's participation in the United Nations Security Council and served on the steering committee of the New Partnership for Africa's Development (NEPAD). He was appointed as Mali's Ambassador to the United States on September 8, 2003.

He was appointed to the government as Minister of Foreign Affairs, African Integration and International Cooperation on 11 April 2014.

See also
 Mali-United States relations
 Foreign relations of Mali 
List of foreign ministers in 2017
List of current foreign ministers

References

External links
 Embassy of Mali website

1965 births
Living people
Ambassadors of Mali to the United States
Foreign Ministers of Mali
Malian diplomats
Paris-Sud University alumni
People from Bamako
21st-century Malian people